A campus board is a training tool that has been widely adopted by sport climbers to improve their plyometric performance; it was invented in 1988 by German climber Wolfgang Güllich to help him climb the world's hardest-ever route, Action Directe, and has since become a standard training tool for climbers.

Description
Typically, a user ascends or descends the campus board using only their hands, and often leaping from hold to hold (i.e both hands are off the board while transitioning between holds).  Campus boards can take a variety of different forms and may incorporate a variety of materials. The earliest campus boards, and still used today, were made of horizontal thin slats or rails of wood attached to an inclined board in a ladderlike configuration.  Later versions have utilized bolt-on climbing holds or sections of a pipe.  A campus board is generally set at an overhanging angle of inclination. One consideration for selecting the angle of inclination is the avoidance of any interference that may result between the user's legs and the campus board or wall.

There are a variety of training approaches that may be used with a campus board, but all of them are centered around the concept of plyometric training.  As one example, a user may alternate the use of specific fingers to increase finger strength when ascending or descending the board. As another example, upper-body strength may be increased by utilizing large lunges between specific rails or holds of the campus board ("power throws").  Reactive training may be used to increase muscle recruitment rates by dynamically moving between the campus board rails simultaneously with one or both hands.  Training on a campus board may result in better performance due to the improvement of motor training, increased finger strength on a variety of grips, and greater power and lock-off strength of the arms.

The campus board has been a topic of controversy especially for newer or younger climbers, as it risks causing injuries to the climber's tendons due to improper technique or fatigue. As such, the campus board is generally not recommended for more novice or younger climbers. 

The first scientific analysis of campus board training was published in 2021.

Development

The campus board was invented by German climber Wolfgang Güllich in 1988 while he was training for a new extreme sport climbing route called Action Directe, which required extreme dynamic finger strength. The first campus board was hung at a university in a gym called "The Campus Centre" in Nuremberg. Hence the term "campus" has been applied to the name of the training board, training method, and style of climbing, or "campusing" in which only the user's hands and arms are used. In French and in Italian, the campus board is referred to as pan Güllich.  Early adopters of the campus board included British climbers Jerry Moffatt and Ben Moon, who trained with Gullich and his climbing partner Kurt Albert, at their German gym.

Hangboard

Subsequent to the development of the campus board, the hangboard was also developed that focuses on building static arm and finger strength. It is a popular training tool for rock climbers and comes in many forms and materials.

See also
Climbing wall
History of rock climbing
Rock-climbing equipment

References

External links
Metolius Campus Board Information

Climbing equipment
Climbing and health
Strength training